The 1987 All-Africa Games football tournament was the 4th edition of the African Games men's football tournament. The football tournament was held in Nairobi, Kenya between 1–12 August 1987 as part of the 1987 All-Africa Games.

Qualification

Squads

Final tournament
The eight teams were divided into two groups of four teams each. The two top teams from each group played the semifinals before the final match.

All times given as local time (UTC+3)

Group stage

Group A

Group B

Knockout stage

Seventh place match

Fifth place match

Semifinals

Third place match

Final

Final ranking

External links
All-African Games 1987 - rsssf.com

1987
1987 All-Africa Games
All-Africa Games